MRT Line 3 may refer to:
 Manila Metro Rail Transit System Line 3, a rapid transit line in Manila, Philippines
 MRT Circle Line, a mass rapid transit line in Kuala Lumpur, Malaysia